Eko Hotels and Suites is a five-star conference centre hotel in Lagos. 07067353711

History
Established in 1977 as Èkó Holiday Inn and built on Victoria Island, it is the largest hotel in Nigeria. It was designed by architect Oluwole Olumuyiwa in collaboration with Americans. It was subsequently renamed Le Meridien Eko Hotel and Suites, Lagos. L'Hotel Eko Le Meridien is part of the Chagoury Group of companies.

Design

The Hotel building comprises 825 rooms and suites in four multistory buildings, clad in white with views of the Atlantic Ocean and the Kuramo Lagoon. The hotel located next to the financial centres of Lagos Island: Victoria Island.  Eko Hotels & Suites has a sister hotel in Port Harcourt named Hotel Presidential.

Events
Eko Hotels & Suites has the largest Convention Centre in Nigeria. Events that have taken place at the hotel include; concerts, movie premieres, international exhibitions, weddings, conferences  and Award ceremonies. The Convention center is usually used for these events and can cater to 6,000 people.

Restaurants
There are eight restaurants and bars within the hotel complex:

The Sky Restaurant & Terrace located on the Roof of the Hotel. 
Crossroads Tex Mex Restaurant and Bar which serves Mexican Cuisine.
1415 Italian Restaurant, located at Eko Signature which specializes in Italian Fine Dining.
Kuramo Sports Café serves continental and local dishes with a full buffet.
Red Chinese Restaurant which is located at the roof behind the Eko Convention Centre.
The Lagoon Breeze Restaurant which is also known for its BBQ Fridays.
The Grill "Steakhouse" located at EKo Suites  
Calabash Bar, an open-air bar by Kuramo Sports Cafe offers special cocktails and other beverages.

See also
 List of hotels in Lagos

References

External links

Hotels established in 1977
1977 establishments in Nigeria
Hotels in Lagos
Resorts in Nigeria
Hotel buildings completed in 1977